Arhopala inornata is a butterfly in the family Lycaenidae. It was described by Cajetan Felder and Rudolf Felder in 1860. 
It is found in the Indomalayan realm.

Subspecies
A. i. inornata Peninsular Malaya, Thailand, Sumatra
A. i. empesta Corbet, 1941  Borneo

References

External links
Arhopala Boisduval, 1832 at Markku Savela's Lepidoptera and Some Other Life Forms. Retrieved June 3, 2017.

Arhopala
Butterflies described in 1860